Vijendra Yadav (born 21 July 1973) is an Indian first-class cricketer who represented Rajasthan. He made his first-class debut for Rajasthan in the 1990-91 Ranji Trophy on 27 December 1990.

References

External links
 

1973 births
Living people
Indian cricketers
Rajasthan cricketers